Hilding Silander (1 March 1893 – 20 October 1972) was a Finnish sailor. He competed in the 8 Metre event at the 1936 Summer Olympics.

References

External links
 

1893 births
1972 deaths
Finnish male sailors (sport)
Olympic sailors of Finland
Sailors at the 1936 Summer Olympics – 8 Metre
People from Porvoo
Sportspeople from Uusimaa